Oman Daily Observer is an English-language daily broadsheet published from Muscat, the capital of the Sultanate of Oman, and it comes under the Ministry of Information. Dr Abdullah Nasser bin Khalifa al-Harrasi is the current Minister of Information.

History and profile
It was established on November 15, 1981, Oman Daily Observer. It is the only English-language newspaper to be published on all seven days in Oman as its two competitors have no editions during weekends.

The 'Observer' focuses on local, national, regional and international news covering current affairs, business, and sports. It also pays special attention to Oman’s economic development, highlighting the country’s natural, historical and cultural wealth.

Abdullah bin Salim al Shueili is current Editor-in-Chief of the Observer since 2013.

References

External links

 

1981 establishments in Oman
Publications established in 1981
Daily newspapers published in Oman
English-language newspapers published in Arab countries
Culture in Muscat, Oman